James Michael Goodwin (born 20 November 1981) is an Irish football manager and former player who is currently the manager of Scottish Premiership club Dundee United.

Goodwin had a playing career from 2000 to 2019 in Scotland and England, playing in a defensive role with Celtic, Stockport County, Scunthorpe United, Huddersfield Town, Hamilton Academical, St Mirren and Alloa Athletic. He also had a loan spell at Oldham Athletic.

Goodwin also played at various levels with Ireland. He played once for the full Republic of Ireland national team, in 2002, and was capped once by the Republic of Ireland B team, in 2007.

Goodwin began his coaching career at St.Mirren as a player-coach. After a stint as assistant manager at Alloa Athletic, he became the club's manager and helped them win a promotion. He returned to St Mirren in June 2019 as manager. In February 2022 he left St Mirren to take over as manager of Aberdeen, but was sacked 11 months later following a series of poor results. In March 2023, Goodwin was appointed manager of Dundee United until the end of the season.

Playing career

Early career
Born in Tramore, he began his professional career with Scottish club Celtic where he made one appearance for the club in 2000 before moving to Stockport County in 2002. Goodwin made his debut for Stockport in their 1–1 draw at home to Queens Park Rangers, he made 33 appearances scoring 3 goals during his first season at the club. His first game of the 2003–04 season came in their 1–0 loss away at Wycombe Wanderers and his first goal of the season came in Stockport's 2–2 draw at home to Notts County in October 2003. Goodwin made 34 appearances, scoring 4 goals throughout the 2003–04 season. Goodwin left Stockport in 2005 after making 103 appearances and scoring seven goals from 2002 to 2005.

Scunthorpe United
Goodwin was signed by Scunthorpe United in 2005, where he made 84 appearances scoring six goals between 2005 and 2008. He was injured in a pre-season friendly shortly after signing, and then suffered a further setback with the injury. In an eventful debut he scored his first goal for the club in their 3–1 home defeat to Brentford on 26 November 2005, and was also sent off. He was part of the Scunthorpe side that won League One in the 2006–07 season. Goodwin was released by Scunthorpe on 8 May 2008, along with two other players after the club were relegated from The Championship after one season in the division. His last game being the victory at home against Cardiff City, when he was substituted at half-time. He was also named as Scunthorpe player of the year 2007 and won goal of the season 2007.

Huddersfield Town
On 5 June 2008, he signed a three-year deal at Huddersfield Town. He along with five other players made his debut in the 1–1 draw against Stockport County at the Galpharm Stadium on 9 August 2008. On 28 December, he scored his first goal for Huddersfield when he scored to give Town the lead against ex-club Scunthorpe in a 2–0 victory.

After missing the beginning of the 2009–10 season due to a knee operation, he made his first appearances of the season coming on as a 79th-minute substitute in a 2–1 home win over Yeovil Town on 29 August 2009. His first start came in the next match, a Football League Trophy first-round tie at Rotherham United on 1 September, which Town won 2–1. He made his first and only League start for Huddersfield in the 2009–10 season, in a 2–1 loss away at Walsall. Goodwin made seven appearances for the Terriers during the 2009–10 season, before moving on loan to Oldham Athletic until the end of the season. Goodwin was released from his contract on 31 August 2010.

Oldham Athletic (loan)
On 1 January 2010, he joined fellow League One side Oldham on an emergency month's loan. He made his debut in the 2–1 defeat by Hartlepool United the following day. The loan was then extended until the end of the 2009–10 season. Goodwin made eight appearances in his time at the club.

Hamilton Academical
After leaving Huddersfield, he joined Hamilton Academical on 6 September 2010. His debut for the club came on 11 September 2010, in a 2–1 home defeat against Rangers.

St Mirren
Goodwin signed for St Mirren after his contract at Hamilton expired in January 2011. He made his debut at St Mirren Park on 8 January, when he started against Peterhead in a Scottish Cup tie. After the release of defender John Potter, Goodwin was appointed captain of the club for the 2011–12 season.

Goodwin quickly became a fans' favourite due to his tough tackling, leadership qualities, diving headers and the quality of his long-range shooting. He often switched the play and moved out wide to deliver early crosses to teammate Steven Thompson. He usually sat in front of the back four in the team's 4–3–3 formation as a holding midfielder to allow the other midfielders to get forward. However, in the 2012–2013 campaign, Goodwin played most games at centre half, forming a partnership with Marc McAusland. The same pair started the 2013–14 season playing together also.

Goodwin netted his first goal for the club on 20 September 2011, against St Johnstone to send St Mirren into the quarter-finals of the Scottish League Cup, rifling a shot into the top corner from the edge of the box in front of the away fans.

The Irishman's second goal for the Paisley club, and second of the 2011–12 season, came in an away league fixture against Motherwell on 17 December 2011. Goodwin scored a "superb strike from 35 yards out" past Well keeper Darren Randolph to level the score at 1–1. Goodwin described the goal as the "best one of my career," and won the Man of the Match award for his strong performance. Following the match, Goodwin was offered a two-match ban by the Scottish Football Association's compliance offer, after an incident with Motherwell's Steve Jennings, who was also offered the same punishment. On 20 December 2011, Goodwin accepted the suspension.

Goodwin became a huge favourite within the St Mirren support for his 'no-nonsense' approach to players, matches and referees. Many fans likened the midfielder to club legend Billy Abercromby, who also enjoyed a similar style.

Goodwin signed a new contract with St Mirren in January 2012, after Hibernian had expressed interest in signing him. He was suspended for the first two games of the 2012–13 Scottish Premier League season. Goodwin scored yet another goal from distance in a home SPL tie against Hearts, driving the ball past opposing keeper Jamie MacDonald from 40 yards with a terrific strike. On 17 March 2013, Goodwin captained St Mirren as they won the 2013 Scottish League Cup Final with a 3–2 victory against Hearts, the club's first major cup trophy in 26 years After the match, Goodwin told BBC Scotland he was overjoyed at winning the League Cup and says "You watch so many legends going up those [Hampden] steps over the years, you just hope, as a boy, that you're going to get the opportunity to do it, I've fulfilled one of my dreams today. It's such a proud moment for me. Loads of my family are over from Ireland. It's a St Patrick's Day that will live with me forever.".

On 30 December 2013, Goodwin was given a two-match suspension after St Mirren accepted the offer of the ban from the SFA's compliance officer, following a clash with Stuart Armstrong of Dundee United in a match four days earlier.

On 13 May 2014, Goodwin signed a new two-year contract with the club, taking on a player-coach role to assist newly appointed St Mirren manager Tommy Craig. After Tommy Craig left Saints in December 2014, it was confirmed that Goodwin would return to playing duties only. The midfielder had taken on a player-coach role in the summer, but it is thought that ill-discipline while playing had cost him this role.

He was released by St Mirren at the end of the 2015–16 season.

Alloa Athletic
On 13 June 2016, Goodwin signed for Scottish League One side Alloa Athletic. He scored his first goal for the club in a 2-2 draw with Stenhousemuir on 24 September 2016, but he was later sent off in the same game. Goodwin became player-manager after the departure of Jack Ross, and considered ending his playing career shortly afterwards. Goodwin made no further playing appearances after January that season, and then returned to play three more games in September at the start of the following season.

International career
Goodwin has represented the Republic of Ireland at international level being capped at Under-16, Under 21, B level and at full international level. Goodwin was at the heart of the defence for the Republic of Ireland under-16 along with fellow Waterford man John O'Shea, as they won the 1998 UEFA European Under-16 Football Championship in Perth, Scotland.

Goodwin was captain of the Republic of Ireland under-21 before making the step up to full international level, earning one cap for Republic of Ireland national football team coming on as a substitute for Robbie Keane in a match against Finland in Helsinki. Goodwin was also capped by Republic of Ireland B in 2007 against Scotland B, but was sent-off during the match.

Coaching career

Alloa Athletic
Goodwin was appointed player-manager in October 2016, after Jack Ross had moved to St Mirren. Due to Alloa's status as a semi-professional club, Goodwin also worked at a car leasing company, a construction recruitment firm, ran his own courier company and had a job as a Cadbury chocolate salesman. He led the club to promotion to the Scottish Championship on May 2018 via the play-offs. Under Goodwin's management the club avoided relegation from the Championship in 2018–19, despite having part-time players and staff.

St Mirren
Goodwin returned to St Mirren in June 2019 as manager, succeeding Oran Kearney. A 1–0 win against last-placed Hearts in the last league match before competitive football was stopped by the COVID-19 pandemic meant that St Mirren finished ninth in the 2019–20 Scottish Premiership. Goodwin signed a new contract with St Mirren in February 2021, with the team sitting in 7th place in the 2020–21 Scottish Premiership. In April 2021 he was issued with a 3 match suspension for criticising a refereeing decision after a draw with Hamilton Academical. Goodwin was also sent off after the match.  In February 2022 Aberdeen met the terms of a release clause in Goodwin’s contract allowing him to end his time at St Mirren.  At the time of his departure, the club were sixth in the 2021–22 Scottish Premiership and had reached the quarter finals of the Scottish Cup.

Aberdeen
On 19 February 2022, Goodwin was appointed manager of Aberdeen on a two-and-a-half year contract following the sacking of Stephen Glass. Aberdeen had reportedly paid £250,000 compensation to end his contract with St Mirren. At the time of joining, the club were seventh in the league and had been knocked out of the Scottish Cup, League Cup and UEFA Conference League. Having won only two of Goodwin’s first twelve league games as manager, Aberdeen finished the 2021–22 Premiership season in tenth place, their lowest position in eighteen years.  Goodwin made substantial changes to the squad with 26 players joining or leaving Aberdeen before the start of the 2022–23 season. In October 2022 Goodwin was given an eight-match touchline ban for remarks made about Hibernian player Ryan Porteous, who had won a controversial penalty against Aberdeen the previous month. The ban was reduced to five games following an appeal.  

In January 2023, Goodwin came under pressure during a run of results which included a 5–0 league defeat by third-placed Hearts, followed by a 1–0 Scottish Cup loss to Darvel.  The defeat by the West of Scotland Football League (sixth tier) team was described as Aberdeen's worst result in their 120-year history.  Club chairman Dave Cormack subsequently released a statement saying: "Jim has been left in no doubt that the Board and the fans are seeking an immediate response from him and the players.” Aberdeen lost their next game 6–0 away to Hibernian in the league in a game termed “El Sackio” (a play on words of El Clásico) due to the precarious position of both managers; this was Aberdeen's largest magnitude of defeat to Hibernian in their history. Goodwin was sacked as Aberdeen manager after the match.

Dundee United
Goodwin was appointed manager of Dundee United, on a short-term contract, on 1 March 2023.

Career statistics

Club

Managerial record

 St Mirren statistics include League Cup forfeit win against Dumbarton on 9 July 2021 (Co-vid Pandemic).

Honours

Player
Scunthorpe United
Football League One: 2006–07

St Mirren
Scottish League Cup: 2012–13

International
UEFA European Under-17 Championship: 1998

Manager
Alloa Athletic
Scottish Championship play-offs: 2017–18

References

News

External links

1981 births
Living people
Association footballers from County Waterford
Republic of Ireland association footballers
Republic of Ireland international footballers
Republic of Ireland under-21 international footballers
Republic of Ireland expatriate association footballers
Association football utility players
Association football midfielders
Association football central defenders
Celtic F.C. players
Stockport County F.C. players
Scunthorpe United F.C. players
Huddersfield Town A.F.C. players
Oldham Athletic A.F.C. players
Hamilton Academical F.C. players
English Football League players
Scottish Premier League players
St Mirren F.C. players
Alloa Athletic F.C. players
Republic of Ireland B international footballers
Republic of Ireland youth international footballers
Scottish Professional Football League players
Expatriate footballers in Scotland
Irish expatriate sportspeople in England
Irish expatriate sportspeople in Scotland
Republic of Ireland football managers
Alloa Athletic F.C. managers
St Mirren F.C. non-playing staff
St Mirren F.C. managers
Aberdeen F.C. managers
Scottish Professional Football League managers
Dundee United F.C. managers